Robinson Department Store is a Thai owned department store. It was established in 1979 and was merged with Central Group in 1995. It is positioned as a mid-market retailer. The company, Robinson Public Company Limited, was registered in the stock exchange of Thailand in 1992 under the ticker . It is listed on the SET50 index. The company and its subsidiaries operate department stores under the Robinson brand and shopping centers under Robinson Lifestyle brand.

As of year-end 2014 operated 39 stores in Thailand and two in Vietnam totaling over 450,000 m2 of retail space. A total of 48 branches were scheduled by the end of 2018: 11 branches in Bangkok Metropolitan Region and 37 branches in other provinces, together with 2 branches in Vietnam.

Stores

Bangkok Metropolitan

Region

Overseas 
In 2014, the company expanded its business to Vietnam under the “ROBINS” name.

See also
 Robinson Lifestyle Center
 Central Department Store
 The Mall Department Store
 Zen Department Store
 Chirathivat family

References

 http://robins.listedcompany.com/
 https://www.robinson.co.th/

External links
Robinson website

Department stores of Thailand
Central Group
Retail companies established in 1979
Companies based in Bangkok
Companies listed on the Stock Exchange of Thailand
1979 establishments in Thailand
Thai brands